Septic thrombophlebitis refers to venous thrombosis and inflammation associated with bacteremia.

Causes
It can occur following throat infections, dental procedures, gingivitis, or central lines. Following pregnancy septic pelvic thrombophlebitis may occur.

Diagnosis

Treatment
Treatment is mainly antibiotic and may involve heparin.

See also 
 Superficial thrombophlebitis
 List of cutaneous conditions

References

External links 

Vascular-related cutaneous conditions